Amandine Vaupré (born 22 April 1982) is a French rugby union player. She represented  at the 2010 Women's Rugby World Cup. Vaupré was a swimmer as a young girl and also participated in Judo.

References

1982 births
Living people
French female rugby union players
French female judoka
21st-century French women